The 1968 Cork Junior Hurling Championship was the 71st staging of the Cork Junior Hurling Championship since its establishment by the Cork County Board. The championship ran from 15 September to 17 November 1968.

The final was played on 17 November 1968 at Páirc Mac Gearailt in Fermoy, between Newtownshandrum and Inniscarra, in what was their first ever meeting in the final. Newtownshandrum won the match by 1-09 to 2-04 to claim their second championship title overall and a first title in 22 years.

Qualification

Results

Quarter-finals

Semi-finals

Final

References

Cork Junior Hurling Championship
Cork Junior Hurling Championship